Pedanius Dioscorides (40–90 AD),  “the father of pharmacognosy”, was a Greek physician, pharmacologist, botanist, and author of De materia medica (On Medical Material) —a 5-volume Greek encyclopedia about herbal medicine and related medicinal substances (a pharmacopeia), that was widely read for more than 1,500 years. For almost two millennia Dioscorides was regarded as the most prominent writer on plants and plant drugs.

Life
A native of Anazarbus, Cilicia, Asia Minor, Dioscorides likely studied medicine nearby at the school in Tarsus, which had a pharmacological emphasis, and he dedicated his medical books to Laecanius Arius, a medical practitioner there. Though he writes he lived a "soldier's life" or "soldier-like life", his pharmacopeia refers almost solely to plants found in the Greek-speaking eastern Mediterranean, making it likely that he served in campaigns, or travelled in a civilian capacity, less widely as supposed. The name Pedanius is Roman, suggesting that an aristocrat of that name sponsored him to become a Roman citizen.

De materia medica

Between AD 50 and 70  Dioscorides wrote a five-volume book in his native Greek,  (Perì hylēs íatrikēs), known in Western Europe more often by its Latin title De materia medica ("On Medical Material"), which became the precursor to all modern pharmacopeias.

In contrast to many classical authors, Dioscorides' works were not "rediscovered" in the Renaissance, because his book had never left circulation; indeed, with regard to Western materia medica through the early modern period, Dioscorides' text eclipsed the Hippocratic corpus. 

In the medieval period, De materia medica was circulated in Greek, as well as Latin and Arabic translation. 

While being reproduced in manuscript form through the centuries, it was often supplemented with commentary and minor additions from Arabic and Indian sources. Ibn al-Baitar's commentary on Dioscorides' De materia medica, entitled : , has been used by scholars to identify many of the flora mentioned by Dioscorides. 

A number of illustrated manuscripts of De materia medica survive. The most famous of these is the lavishly illustrated Vienna Dioscurides, produced in Constantinople in 512/513 AD. Densely illustrated Arabic copies survive from the 12th and 13th centuries, while Greek manuscripts survive today in the monasteries of Mount Athos.

De materia medica is the prime historical source of information about the medicines used by the Greeks, Romans, and other cultures of antiquity. The work also records the Dacian, Thracian, Roman, ancient Egyptian and North African (Carthaginian) names for some plants, which otherwise would have been lost. The work presents about 600 plants in all, although the descriptions are sometimes obscurely phrased, leading to comments such as: "Numerous individuals from the Middle Ages on have struggled with the identity of the recondite kinds", while some of the botanical identifications of Dioscorides' plants remain merely guesses.

De materia medica formed the core of the European pharmacopeia through the 19th century, suggesting that "the timelessness of Dioscorides' work resulted from an empirical tradition based on trial and error; that it worked for generation after generation despite social and cultural changes and changes in medical theory".

The plant genus Dioscorea, which includes the yam, was named after him by Linnaeus. A butterfly, the Bush hopper, Ampittia dioscorides which is found from India southeast towards Indonesia and east towards China,  is named after him.

Gallery

Translations

See also

 Materia medica
 Dioscorea

Notes

References

Sources

 
 Bruins: Codex Constantinopolitanus: Palatii Veteris NO. 1 [3 volume set] Part 1: Reproduction of the Manuscript; Part 2: Greek Text; Part 3: Translation and Commentary Bruins, E. M. (Ed.)
 Forbes, Andrew; Henley, Daniel; Henley, David (2013). 'Pedanius Dioscorides' in: Health and Well Being: A Medieval Guide. Chiang Mai: Cognoscenti Books.

External links

 
 
 Works by Dioscorides
 Dioscorides Materia Medica, in English—the full book downloadable in PDF fileformat.
 
 
 Pedacio Dioscorides anazarbeo: Acerca de la materia medicinal y de los venenos mortiferos, Antwerp, 1555, digitized at Biblioteca Digital Hispánica, Biblioteca Nacional de España
 Les VI livres de Ped. Diosc. de la materie medicinale, Lyon (1559), French edition
 The 1500th Anniversary (512-2012) of the Juliana Anicia Codex: An Illustrated Dioscoridean Recension. Jules Janick and Kim E. Hummer. Chronica horticulturae. 52(3) 2012 pp. 9-15

 

40 births
90 deaths
Ancient Greek writers
Ancient Greek pharmacologists
1st-century Greek physicians
Pre-Linnaean botanists
Ancient Greek botanists
Herbalists
1st-century writers
Dioscorides
1st-century agronomists